Kirk Samuel Penney (born 23 November 1980) is a New Zealand professional basketball player. He played four years of college basketball for the Wisconsin Badgers between 1999 and 2003, where he was twice named first-team all-conference and an all-American. He became the second New Zealander in the NBA when he appeared briefly for the Miami Heat in 2003 and the Los Angeles Clippers in 2005, and went on to play professionally in Spain, the NBA Development League, Israel, Lithuania, Germany and Turkey. He also played six seasons for the New Zealand Breakers of the Australian National Basketball League (NBL). He was named the NBL MVP in 2009 won his a championship with the Breakers in 2011.

Penney represented New Zealand at the Sydney and Athens Olympics and averaged 16.9 points at the World Championships at Indianapolis in 2002 and 24.7 points at the World Championships at Turkey in 2010.

Early life
Born in the Auckland suburb of Milford, Penney attended Westlake Boys High School and played junior basketball for the North Harbour Basketball Association, joining their New Zealand NBL team, the North Harbour Kings, in 1998 as a 17-year-old. He earned NZNBL Rookie of the Year honours that year and helped the Kings reach the grand final. He also played for the Kings in 1999 and 2000.

College career
As a freshman playing for the Wisconsin Badgers during the 1999–2000 season, Penney had a minimal role under coach Dick Bennett, but still helped his team reach the NCAA Final Four while averaging 3.7 points and 1.4 rebounds in 34 games. As a sophomore in 2000–01, he averaged 11.2 points per game and was the second-leading scorer on the team.

As a junior in 2001–02 playing for coach Bo Ryan, Penney was the team's leading scorer. He averaged 15.1 points and 4.9 rebounds per game while shooting 45.4 percent from the field and teamed with point guard Devin Harris to guide the Badgers to a share of the Big Ten title. Penney subsequently earned first-team All-Big Ten honours in 2001–02.

As a senior in 2002–03, Penney was again the team's leading scorer. He averaged 16.2 points and was second on the team with 6.0 rebounds per game, as Wisconsin won the Big Ten regular-season title outright. For his senior-year efforts, Penney earned first-team All-Big Ten honours again and was named an honorable mention All-American. His 217 career three-point field goals made ranks third in program history.

Professional career

NBA and Europe (2003–2007)
Penney was not drafted in the star-studded 2003 NBA draft but joined the Minnesota Timberwolves in July that year for the Orlando Pro Summer League where he led the league in three-point shooting. On 1 September 2003, he signed with the Timberwolves, but did not make the team's final roster as he was waived on 23 October prior to the start of the 2003–04 NBA season. On 3 November, he signed with the Miami Heat and made his NBA debut that same day, scoring three points in 14 minutes of action against the Dallas Mavericks. Penney became the second New Zealander (after Sean Marks) to play in the NBA. The following day, he made his second appearance for the Heat, but record no stats in just four minutes of action against the San Antonio Spurs. On 7 November, he was waived by the Heat after the team signed Tyrone Hill instead.

Following his release from the Heat, Penney moved to Spain and signed with Gran Canaria for the rest of the 2003–04 season. In 24 Liga ACB games for Canaria, he averaged 10.6 points and 2.1 rebounds per game.

In July 2004, Penney joined the Minnesota Timberwolves for the Minnesota Summer League in Minneapolis, and the Chicago Bulls for the Rocky Mountain Revenue in Salt Lake City. On 4 November 2004, he was selected with the sixth overall pick in the 2004 NBA Development League Draft by the Asheville Altitude. He had an impressive start to the 2004–05 season and earned himself an NBA call-up. On 26 December 2004, he signed with the Los Angeles Clippers. He appeared in four games for the Clippers and scored just two points. He was waived by the Clippers on 3 January 2005 and returned to the Asheville Altitude to play out the season and help the team win the 2005 NBA D-League championship.

On 5 August 2005, Penney signed a two-year deal with Maccabi Tel Aviv of the Israeli Basketball Premier League. He was used sparingly as a shooter off the bench and helped Maccabi qualify for the Euroleague Final Four, eventually losing to CSKA Moscow in the final. Maccabi did, however, win the 2006 Premier League championship. In 19 Euroleague games for Maccabi in 2005–06, Penney averaged 3.3 points per game.

In October 2006, Penney signed with Žalgiris Kaunas as an injury replacement for Marcelinho Machado. After Žalgiris won the Lithuanian Basketball League Cup, Penney parted ways with Žalgiris. On 16 February 2007, he signed with ALBA Berlin of Germany for the rest of the 2006–07 season.

New Zealand Breakers (2007–2010)
In June 2007, Penney signed with the New Zealand Breakers of the Australian National Basketball League. Penney's addition to the previously unsuccessful Breakers proved to be the tonic for the Breakers success, with the team qualifying for their first ever finals series, before eventually finishing in sixth position overall in 2007–08. Individually, Penney was the league's third leading scorer, averaging 24.2 points, 4.8 rebounds, 2.6 assists and 1.3 steals over 31 games, was a starter for the World All-Stars team, and was named to the All-NBL first team.

In the 2008–09 season, Penney led the league in scoring and was the first Kiwi player ever to be named in the All-NBL first team for consecutive seasons. He took home the Andrew Gaze MVP trophy for leading the Breakers to their best season ever, averaging 24.2 points, 4.4 rebounds and 2.8 assists over 28 games, making Penney the first Kiwi to be honoured with the award.

On 21 January 2010, Penney scored a career-high 49 points in a 103–89 win over the Adelaide 36ers in Auckland. During the 2009–10 season, he was once again named to the All-NBL first team.

Skyforce and Spurs (2010)
Following the conclusion of the 2009–10 NBL season, Penney returned to the United States, and on 24 March 2010, he was acquired by the Sioux Falls Skyforce of the NBA Development League. In just his second game for the Skyforce, he scored a game-high 31 points on 12-of-17 shooting from the field, adding four rebounds, three assists and a steal in 43 minutes of game time in a 113–104 win over the Springfield Armor. In the Skyforce's final game of the regular season, he scored 40 points in a win over the Bakersfield Jam. The Skyforce made it to the first round of the playoffs where they lost to the Tulsa 66ers 2–1 in the best-of-three series. In seven total games for the Skyforce, he averaged 22.7 points, 4.4 rebounds, 2.1 assists and 1.4 steals per game.

On 28 September 2010, Penney signed with the San Antonio Spurs. However, he was later waived by the Spurs on 11 October after appearing in one preseason game and scoring 9 points.

First NBL Championship (2010–11)
On 26 October 2010, Penney returned to the New Zealand Breakers for the 2010–11 NBL season. For the first three games of the season, Leon Henry filled in for Penney, but upon his return, Henry was swiftly moved out of the 10-man roster. In 2010–11, Penney led the Breakers to their first NBL championship as they defeated the Cairns Taipans in the grand final series, 2–1. He was again named to the All-NBL first team after averaging 20.0 points, 4.0 rebounds and 2.3 assists per game.

Return to Europe (2011–2015)
On 29 July 2011, Penney signed with Baloncesto Fuenlabrada of Spain for the 2011–12 season. During the 2011–12 ACB season, Penney was the fifth leading points scorer with 14.4 points per game.

In July 2012, Penney signed with TED Ankara Kolejliler of Turkey for the 2012–13 season. During the 2012–13 TBL season, Penney was the league's third leading points scorer with 18.3 points per game, hitting over 46% of his three-point shots.

In August 2013, Penney signed with Trabzonspor for the 2013–14 season.

In mid-2014, Penney returned to the University of Wisconsin to finish off his degree. On 26 January 2015, he signed with Baloncesto Sevilla of the Spanish Liga ACB. In 16 games for Sevilla, he averaged 11.3 points, 3.3 rebounds and 1.8 assists per game.

Illawarra Hawks (2015–2016)
On 27 July 2015, Penney signed with the Illawarra Hawks for the 2015–16 NBL season. In just the third game of the season on 14 October, he scored a season-high 36 points in a 96–75 win over his former team, the New Zealand Breakers. He didn't miss a game for the Hawks over the team's first 22 contests before a hamstring injury suffered on 17 January 2016 against the Breakers forced him to miss four straight games. He returned to action on 6 February, scoring 28 points in a 104–97 overtime win over the Townsville Crocodiles. He helped the Hawks finish the regular season in third place with a 17–11 win–loss record, booking themselves a semi-final clash with the second-seeded Perth Wildcats. After losing Game 1 in Perth, the Hawks took Game 2 at home to save the series, but went on to lose the deciding Game 3 in Perth, bowing out of the playoffs with a 2–1 defeat. In 27 games for the Hawks in 2015–16, Penney averaged 20.4 points, 3.0 rebounds and 3.1 assists per game.

Return to the Breakers (2016–2018)
On 12 April 2016, Penney signed a three-year deal with the New Zealand Breakers. On 7 October 2016, he played in his first game for the Breakers since 2011, scoring nine points in a 76–71 season-opening win over Melbourne United. On 29 October 2016, he scored 27 points in a 119–93 win over the Adelaide 36ers. On 6 November 2016, he scored 30 points in an 86–70 win over the Brisbane Bullets. He appeared in all 28 games for the Breakers in 2016–17, averaging 17.3 points, 3.4 rebounds and 2.4 assists per game.

The Breakers started the 2017–18 season with a 9–1 record, before dropping to 9–3 with two Round 8 defeats. In the second defeat of Round 8, Penney was held scoreless for the first time in his 174-game NBL career. On 15 December 2017, against the Adelaide 36ers in Auckland, Penney played his 150th game for the Breakers. The Breakers finished the regular season in fourth place with a 15–13 record. On 22 February 2018, with finals only a week away, Penney announced his decision to retire at the end of the 2017–18 season. His final game came in the Breakers season-ending loss to Melbourne United in Game 2 of their semi-finals series; in the 88–86 overtime loss, Penney had 17 points off the bench. In 22 games in 2017–18, he averaged 10.1 points, 2.7 rebounds and 1.0 assists per game.

Auckland Tuatara (2022)
In August 2022, Penney came out of retirement to play for the Auckland Tuatara of the New Zealand NBL in their final regular season game of the 2022 season.

Career statistics

NBA

|-
| align="left" | 
| align="left" | Miami
| 2 || 0 || 9.0 || .167 || .333 || .000 || .5 || .5 || .5 || .0 || 1.5
|-
| align="left" | 
| align="left" | L.A. Clippers
| 4 || 0 || 3.0 || .333 || .000 || .000 || .4 || .3 || .0 || .0 || .5
|-
| align="left" | Career
| align="left" | 
| 6 || 0 || 5.0 || .222 || .250 || .000 || .3 || .3 || .2|| .0 || .8

Euroleague

|-
| style="text-align:left;"| 2005–06
| style="text-align:left;"| Maccabi Tel Aviv
| 19 || 0 || 7.3 || .588 || .478 || .714 || .8 || .1 || .2 || .0 || 3.3 || 2.4
|-
| style="text-align:left;"| 2006–07
| style="text-align:left;"| Žalgiris
| 13 || 2 || 18.5 || .514 || .452 || .500 || 2.0 || .8 || .2 || .0 || 7.4 || 5.2

National team career
Penney debuted for the New Zealand national basketball team in 1999 at the age of 18, going on to represent the Tall Blacks at two Olympic Games (in 2000 and 2004) and four world championships (2002, 2006, 2010 and 2014).

Penney was part of the Tall Blacks' memorable 2002 World Championships campaign as they surprisingly finished fourth. Penney averaged 16.9 points per game and hit 45.5% of his three-point shots.

Penney led New Zealand to victory in the 2009 FIBA Oceania Championship, beating Australia 177–162 on aggregate, after the two-match tie was drawn 1–1. Penney was influential in both games, with 23 points and 4 assists in Game 1, and a 24 points, 7 rebounds and 10 assists in Game 2, thus winning the Al Ramsay Shield.

In the 2010 World Championships in Turkey, Penney was the second leading scorer with 24.7 points per game. New Zealand also went through to the elimination rounds with a 3–2 record.

Penney participated for New Zealand at the 2014 FIBA Basketball World Cup in Spain and averaged 10.8 points and 4.5 rebounds in six games.

In May 2016, Penney retired from international basketball after a career spanning 15 years (1999–2014).

In May 2022, Penney was inducted into the Basketball New Zealand Hall of Fame.

Personal life
Penney is the brother of Rodd Penney, who is also a professional sportsman, and has played Rugby Union in New Zealand, England and Italy. Penney and his wife, Audra, have a daughter named Olivia.

During the 2019–20 U.S. college season, Penney served as director of player development and coaching staff consultant at the University of Virginia.

Awards and achievements

Individual achievements
1998 New Zealand NBL Rookie of the Year
1999 New Zealand NBL Outstanding Kiwi Guard
2001–02 First Team All-Big Ten 
2002–03 First Team All-Big Ten
2002–03 Honorable Mention All-American
2006–07 Baltic Basketball League All-Star
2007–08 All-NBL First Team
2008–09 All-NBL First Team
2008–09 Australian NBL MVP
2009–10 All-NBL First Team
2010–11 All-NBL First Team
2011 Stanković Cup MVP
2012–13 TBL All-Star
2012–13 TBL Three-Point Shootout champion
2013–14 TBL All-Star
2013–14 TBL Three-Point Shootout champion
2015–16 All-NBL Second Team

Team achievements
2001–02 Big Ten Champions (Wisconsin)
2002–03 Big Ten Champions (Wisconsin)
2004–05 NBA Development League Champions (Asheville Altitude)
2005–06 Israeli Basketball Premier League Champions (Maccabi Tel Aviv)
2005–06 Israeli Basketball State Cup Champions (Maccabi Tel Aviv)
2006–07 Lithuanian Basketball League Cup Champions (Žalgiris Kaunas)
2010–11 Australian NBL Champions (New Zealand Breakers)

New Zealand national team
2000 William Jones Cup Champions
2000 Olympic Games, 11th place
2001 Goodwill Games
2002 FIBA World Championship, 4th place
2004 Olympic Games
2006 FIBA World Championship, 16th place
2007 Stanković Cup
2008 FIBA Olympic Qualifying Tournament
2009 FIBA Oceania Championship, 1st place (Gold)
2010 FIBA World Championship, 12th place
2011 Stanković Cup, 1st place (Gold)
2014 FIBA World Championship

References

External links

 Illawarra Hawks player profile
 NBA D-League profile
 Wisconsin bio
 Euroleague.net profile
 Spanish ACB profile 
 FIBA.com profile
 TBLStat.net profile
 Basketball New Zealand profile
 "The mysterious case of Kirk Penney's 'possible' NBL fairytale comeback with Tuatara" at stuff.co.nz

1980 births
Living people
2002 FIBA World Championship players
2006 FIBA World Championship players
2010 FIBA World Championship players
2014 FIBA Basketball World Cup players
Alba Berlin players
Asheville Altitude players
Baloncesto Fuenlabrada players
Basketball players at the 2000 Summer Olympics
Basketball players at the 2004 Summer Olympics
Basketball players from Auckland
BC Žalgiris players
CB Gran Canaria players
Competitors at the 2001 Goodwill Games
Illawarra Hawks players
Israeli Basketball Premier League players
Liga ACB players
Los Angeles Clippers players
Maccabi Tel Aviv B.C. players
Miami Heat players
National Basketball Association players from New Zealand
New Zealand Breakers players
New Zealand expatriate basketball people in Australia
New Zealand expatriate basketball people in Germany
New Zealand expatriate basketball people in Israel
New Zealand expatriate basketball people in Lithuania
New Zealand expatriate basketball people in Spain
New Zealand expatriate basketball people in Turkey
New Zealand expatriate basketball people in the United States
New Zealand men's basketball players
Olympic basketball players of New Zealand
People educated at Westlake Boys High School
Real Betis Baloncesto players
Shooting guards
Sioux Falls Skyforce players
Small forwards
TED Ankara Kolejliler players
Trabzonspor B.K. players
Undrafted National Basketball Association players
Wisconsin Badgers men's basketball players